Marcel Rigout (10 May 1928 – 23 August 2014) was a French politician. He served as Minister of Vocational Training from 1981 to 1984, under former President François Mitterrand. From an early age, he was a member of the French Communist Party. To improve vocational skills, while serving as a government minister, Rigout helped to set up some 800 centres called either PAIO or missions locales between 1982 and 1984 where youngsters were provided with vocational guidance.

Bibliography
L'autre chance (1983)

References

1928 births
2014 deaths
Government ministers of France
French Communist Party politicians